Nimar is the name of a region in Madhya Pradesh, India. 

There have been several historical administrative districts bearing the name of this region:
Nimar District, Indore State -> 1947 Nimar District, Madhya Bharat -> 1956-11-01 West Nimar District -> Khargone District
Nimar District, Central Provinces -> 1947 Nimar District, Madhya Pradesh -> 1956-11-01 East Nimar District
2003-08-15 Khandwa District
2003-08-15 Burhanpur District

All three successors of the first two Nimar Districts lie in Indore Division.

Districts of Madhya Pradesh